José Emeterio Hazim Frappier (born 19 February 1951) is a physician, academician and politician from the Dominican Republic. He was the 2004 Social Christian Reformist Party candidate for Vice President of the Dominican Republic and Senator for the province of San Pedro de Macorís from 1994 to 2006. Hazim was Interim president of his party during the illness of the late Carlos Morales Troncoso.

References 

Living people
1951 births
Dominican Republic people of German descent
Dominican Republic people of Lebanese descent
Social Christian Reformist Party politicians
Members of the Senate of the Dominican Republic
White Dominicans